Eshel HaNasi (lit. Tamarisk of the President) is a youth village in southern Israel. Located between Beersheba and Ofakim, it falls under the jurisdiction of Merhavim Regional Council.

History
A school was established on the site in 1951, and took its name from the tamarisk trees that grow in the region, and from the title of the President of Israel, in honor of Israel's first president, Chaim Weizmann. Taken together, the name means "Tamarisk of the President."

The following year an agricultural school and youth village were founded on the site, taking the name of the original school. Today it contains a boarding school and a high school teaching around 1,500 pupils from 7th to 12th grade.

References

External links
Official website 

Youth villages in Israel
Community settlements
Populated places established in 1952
Populated places in Southern District (Israel)
1952 establishments in Israel